Machines Will Always Let You Down, released in 2007, is the third full-length album from the noise rock band, Replicator.

Track listing
 "Delicious Fornicake" - 2:17
 "Payment www.yzzz.RD" - 4:51
 "Assloads of Unrespect" - 4:11
 "Fashionably Latent" - 4:57
 "Enigma Machine" - 2:11
 "King Shit of Fuck Mountain" - 2:18
 "Happy Loyalty Day" - 1:53
 "The Tiny Machines Are (Still) Out for Revenge" - 4:55
 "Outrage Fatigue" - 3:24
 "Login with My Fist" - 5:40

References 

 Spotify – Delicious Fornicake - song by Replicator
 Spotify – Payment Www.yzzz.rd - song by Replicator
 Spotify – Assloads of Unrespect - song by Replicator
 Press About fashionablylatent.com - Fashionably Latent - View All (pressaboutus.com)

2007 albums
Replicator (band) albums